The 2017–18 Macedonian Second Football League was the 26th season of the Macedonian Second Football League, the second division in the Macedonian football league system. The fixtures were announced on 7 August 2017. The season began on 27 August 2017 and concluded on 19 May 2018. It's the first season since 1999–2000 with the new format, which as the league is divided into two groups, East and West, with 10 teams participating in each group.

East

Participating teams

League table

Results

Matches 1–18

Matches 19–27

West

Participating teams

League table

Results

Matches 1–18

Matches 19–27

Promotion play-offs

Semi-final

Final

See also
2017–18 Macedonian Football Cup
2017–18 Macedonian First Football League
2017–18 Macedonian Third Football League

References

External links
Football Federation of Macedonia 
MacedonianFootball.com 

Macedonia 2
2
Macedonian Second Football League seasons